Highway 940 is a provincial highway in the Canadian province of Saskatchewan. It runs from Highway 922 to a dead end near the eastern shore of Delaronde Lake. Highway 940 is about 5 km (3 mi.) long.

See also 
Roads in Saskatchewan
Transportation in Saskatchewan

References 

940